Shehan Sandaruwan (born 4 August 1996) is a Sri Lankan cricketer. He made his first-class debut for Ragama Cricket Club in the 2015–16 Premier League Tournament on 4 December 2015. He made his Twenty20 debut for Ragama Cricket Club in the 2018–19 SLC Twenty20 Tournament on 18 February 2019. He made his List A debut on 9 April 2021, for Ragama Cricket Club in the 2020–21 Major Clubs Limited Over Tournament.

References

External links
 

1996 births
Living people
Sri Lankan cricketers
Ragama Cricket Club cricketers
People from Ragama